Helena Krajčiová (born 19 April 1975) is a Slovak actress and singer. At the 2010 Sun in a Net Awards she won the category of Best Supporting Actress, for her performance in the film Soul at Peace. Krajčiová was named Best Actress at the 14th OTO Awards.

Selected filmography 
Panelák (television, 2008–2011)
Soul at Peace (2009)
Búrlivé víno (television, 2013–2017)
The Red Captain (2016)
Sestričky (television, 2018–2019)
Nový život (television, 2020–2021)

References

External links

1975 births
Living people
21st-century Slovak women singers
Slovak film actresses
Slovak stage actresses
Slovak television actresses
People from Skalica
21st-century Slovak actresses
Sun in a Net Awards winners